This list contains all cultural property of national significance (class A) in the canton of Zürich from the 2009 Swiss Inventory of Cultural Property of National and Regional Significance. It is sorted by municipality and contains 204 individual buildings, 66 collections, 50 archaeological finds and 3 other, special sites or objects.

The geographic coordinates provided are in the Swiss coordinate system as given in the Inventory.

Adlikon

Affoltern am Albis

Andelfingen

Bäretswil

Bauma

Berg am Irchel

Bülach

Bubikon

Dägerlen

Dinhard

Dübendorf

Dürnten

Eglisau

Elgg

Erlenbach

Fehraltorf

Feuerthalen

Flaach

Flurlingen

Freienstein-Teufen

Glattfelden

Gossau

Greifensee

Grüningen

Hausen am Albis

Henggart

Herrliberg

Hittnau

Hombrechtikon

Horgen

Hüttikon

Illnau-Effretikon

Kappel am Albis

Kilchberg

Kleinandelfingen

Knonau

Küsnacht

Kyburg

Laufen-Uhwiesen

Lindau

Männedorf

Marthalen

Maschwanden

Meilen

Mettmenstetten

Neerach

Neftenbach

Nürensdorf

Oberrieden

Oberstammheim

Oetwil an der Limmat

Ossingen

Otelfingen

Pfäffikon

Pfungen

Rafz

Regensberg

Regensdorf

Rheinau

Richterswil

Rifferswil

Rorbas

Rümlang

Rüti

Russikon

Schlieren

Seegräben

Stadel

Stäfa

Stallikon

Thalwil

Trüllikon

Turbenthal

Uetikon am See

Uitikon

Unterengstringen

Unterstammheim

Uster

Wädenswil

Wald

Waltalingen

Wallisellen

Wangen-Brüttisellen

Wasterkingen

Weiach

Wetzikon

Wiesendangen

Wila

Winkel

Winterthur

Zürich

References
 All entries, addresses and coordinates are from:

External links

 Swiss Inventory of Cultural Property of National and Regional Significance (2009 KGS edition links):
KGS  Class A objects—
KGS Class B objects—
KGS Geographic information System−GIS
—

 01
cultural property
.
.
.